The Comfort Historic District is a historic district listed in the National Register of Historic Places that encompasses almost all of the original townsite of Comfort, Texas and includes over 100 buildings that represents a century of development from 1854 through 1954.

See also

National Register of Historic Places listings in Kendall County, Texas
Recorded Texas Historic Landmarks in Kendall County

References

External links

Comfort Chamber of Commerce

Geography of Kendall County, Texas
Historic districts on the National Register of Historic Places in Texas
National Register of Historic Places in Kendall County, Texas